Esmailabad (also Romanized as Esmā‘īlābād and Ismā‘īlābād; also known as Esma‘il Abad Behandan) is a village in Shusef Rural District, Shusef District, Nehbandan County, South Khorasan Province, Iran. At the 2006 census, its population was 399, in 91 families.

References 

Populated places in Nehbandan County